The Skopje revolutionary district (Macedonian/Bulgarian: Скопски револуционерен округ) was an organizational grouping of the Bulgarian Macedonian-Adrianople Revolutionary Committees, and its successors, the Secret Macedonian-Adrianople Revolutionary Organization and the Internal Macedonian-Adrianople Revolutionary Organization. The most famous leader of the group was Petar Poparsov. This rebel group was active in Vardar Macedonia with headquarters in Skopje.

Organizations based in Skopje